The giant oarfish (Regalecus glesne) is a species of oarfish of the family Regalecidae. It is an oceanodromous species with a worldwide distribution, excluding polar regions. Other common names include Pacific oarfish, king of herrings, ribbonfish, and streamer fish.

R. glesne is the world's longest bony fish. Its shape is ribbon-like, narrow laterally, with a dorsal fin along its entire length, stubby pectoral fins, and long, oar-shaped pelvic fins, from which its common name is derived. Its coloration is silver and blue with spots of dark pigmentation, and its fins are crimson. Its physical characteristics and undulating mode of swimming have led to speculation that it might be the source of many "sea serpent" sightings.

Taxonomy
R. glesne was first described by Peter Ascanius in 1772. The genus name, Regalecus, signifies "belonging to a king"; the specific epithet glesne is from "Glesnaes", the name of a farm at Glesvær (not far from Norway's second largest city of Bergen), where the type specimen was found.

Its "king of herrings" nickname may derive from its crownlike appendages and from being sighted near shoals of herring, which fishermen thought were being guided by this fish. Its common name, oarfish, is probably an allusion to the shape of its pelvic fins, or else it may refer to the long slender shape of the fish itself.

Distribution
The giant oarfish has a worldwide distribution, having been found as far north as 72°N and as far south as 52°S, but is most commonly found in the tropics to middle latitudes. It has been categorized as oceanodromous, following its primary food source.

Morphology

Few R. glesne larvae have been identified and described in situ. These larvae exhibit an elongated body with rays extending from the occipital crest and a long pelvic fin. Unlike the adult form of the species, the skin of the larvae is almost entirely transparent with intermittent spots of dark coloration along the organism's dorsum. Additionally, the larvae possess a caudal fin with four fin rays, which is a trait not present in the adult form of the species.

Adults have a ribbonlike shape that is laterally narrow, with a dorsal fin along its entire length from between its eyes to the tip of its tail. The dorsal fin rays are soft and number between 414 and 449 in total. At the head of the fish, the first 10-12 of these dorsal fin rays are lengthened, forming the distinctive red crest associated with the species. Its pectoral and pelvic fins are nearly adjacent. The pectoral fins are stubby while the pelvic fins are long, single-rayed, and reminiscent of an oar in shape, widening at the tip. Its head is small with the protrusible jaw typical of lampriformes. The species has 33 to 47 gill rakers on the first gill arch, and no teeth.

The organs of the giant oarfish are concentrated toward the head end of the body, possibly enabling it to survive losing large portions of its tail. It has no swim bladder. The liver of R. glesne is orange or red, the likely result of astaxanthin in its diet. The lateral line begins above and behind the eye then, descending to the lower third of the body, extends to the caudal tip.

Life cycle 
Much of what is known about the juvenile life cycle of R. glesne comes from artificial insemination work done in a laboratory setting. This work was performed in 2020 and was the first time that the progression from fertilized eggs to larvae was observed. Post-fertilization, the eggs took 18 days to hatch into larvae. They noted that the larvae appeared similar to other lampridiform larvae, facing downward with pectoral fins. The larvae then died four days later, so this study spanned only the early life cycle of the species.

In the field, the species is known to spawn from July to December. The resulting eggs are  large, and float near the surface until hatching. Its larvae are also observed near the surface during this season.

Behavior
Little is known about oarfish behavior. It has been observed swimming by means of its dorsal fin, and also swimming in a vertical position. In 2010, scientists filmed a giant oarfish in the Gulf of Mexico swimming in the mesopelagic layer, the first footage of a reliably identified R. glesne in its natural setting. The footage was caught during a survey, using an ROV in the vicinity of Thunder Horse PDQ, and shows the fish swimming in a columnar orientation, tail downward.

Relationship with humans

R. glesne is not fished commercially, but it is an occasional bycatch in commercial nets.

Due to their size, elongated bodies, and undulating swimming pattern, giant oarfish are presumed to be responsible for some sea serpent sightings.  Formerly considered rare, the species is now suspected to be relatively common, although sightings of healthy specimens in their natural habitat are unusual.

The giant oarfish, and the related R. russelii, are sometimes known as "earthquake fish" because they are popularly believed to surface before and after an earthquake.

References
Citations

External links

 Giant 'Sea Serpent' Caught on Camera, Discovery News at YouTube. Footage of an oarfish swimming in the mesopelagic layer.
 "Mythical sea creature captured on film", article about efforts to ban deep-sea bottom trawling with video of R. glesne
 Recent Examinations of the Oarfish, Regalecus glesne, from the North Sea. Yorkshire Coast Sealife, Fisheries & Maritime Archive & Museum

giant oarfish
Cosmopolitan fish
giant oarfish
Least concern biota of Australia
Least concern biota of North America
Least concern biota of South America
Least concern biota of Africa
Least concern biota of Oceania
Least concern biota of Europe
Taxa named by Peter Ascanius